Below is a partial list of minor league baseball players in the Milwaukee Brewers system.

Players

Jackson Chourio

Jackson Bryan Chourio (born March 11, 2004) is a Venezuelan professional baseball outfielder in the Milwaukee Brewers organization.

Chourio signed with the Milwaukee Brewers as an international free agent in January 2021. He made his professional debut that season with the Dominican Summer League Brewers.

Chourio started 2022 with the Class A Carolina Mudcats, for whom he batted .324(5th in the league)/.373/.600(3rd) in 250 at bats, with 23 doubles (8th), 12 home runs (9th), and 10 stolen bases. He then played for Class A+ Wisconsin, batting .252/.317/.488 in 127 at bats with eight home runs. After the season, he was voted the Carolina League MVP and won the league's Top MLB Prospect Award. He was also named a 2022 MiLB Gold Glove as the one of the three-best defensive outfielders in the minor leagues.

Brent Díaz

Brent Díaz (born March 22, 1996) is an American professional baseball catcher for the Milwaukee Brewers organization.

Díaz attended Gulliver Preparatory School in Miami, Florida, and Louisiana Tech University. He played college baseball for the Louisiana Tech Bulldogs. In 2016, he played collegiate summer baseball with the Yarmouth–Dennis Red Sox of the Cape Cod Baseball League. In 2017, he was named a finalist for the Johnny Bench Award. The Milwaukee Brewers selected Diaz in the 29th round of the 2017 MLB draft, and he signed, forgoing his senior year at Louisiana Tech. He began his professional career with the Helena Brewers and after batting .267 with a .686 OPS in 12 games, was reassigned to the AZL Brewers where he batted .368 with a .987 OPS in 18 games to finish the season. He played in only 26 games in 2018 due to injury.

Díaz returned to Wisconsin for the 2019 season, slashing .245/.361/.385 with four home runs and 24 RBIs over seventy games.

Lucas Erceg

Lucas Stijepan Erceg (born May 1, 1995) is an American professional baseball third baseman and Pitcher in the Milwaukee Brewers organization.

Erceg attended Westmont High School in Campbell, California. He played college baseball at the University of California, Berkeley in 2014 and 2015 and was named first team All-Pac-12 in 2015. Prior to the 2016 season he was ruled academically ineligible and transferred to Menlo College. After one year at Menlo, he was drafted by the Milwaukee Brewers in the second round of the 2016 Major League Baseball Draft.

Erceg made his professional debut with the Helena Brewers of the Rookie-level Pioneer League and was promoted to the Wisconsin Timber Rattlers of the Class A Midwest League after hitting .400 over 26 games. Erceg finished his first professional season with a .327 batting average, nine home runs and 51 RBIs in 68 total games between both teams. In 2017, he played for the Carolina Mudcats of the Class A-Advanced Carolina League where he batted .256 with 15 home runs and 81 RBIs in 127 games along with playing in three games for the Colorado Springs Sky Sox of the Class AAA Pacific Coast League at the end of the season.

MLB.com ranked Ecreg as Milwaukee's fourth ranked prospect going into the 2018 season. He spent the 2018 season with the Biloxi Shuckers of the Class AA Southern League, batting .248 with 13 home runs and 51 RBIs in 123 games. He spent 2019 with the San Antonio Missions of the Class AAA Pacific Coast League, slashing .218/.305/.398 with 15 home runs and 52 RBIs over 116 games.

In 2021, he began to convert to pitcher along with playing third base.

Robert Gasser

Robert Riordan Gasser (born May 31, 1999) is an American professional baseball pitcher in the Milwaukee Brewers organization.
 
Gasser grew up in El Dorado Hills, California and attended Oak Ridge High School.
 
Gasser began his college baseball career at New Mexico. As a freshman, he had a 7.05 ERA over 52 innings pitched. Gasser transferred to San Joaquin Delta College after his freshman year. In his only season with the Mustangs, he went 14-0 with a 2.38 ERA and 139 strikeouts in 102 innings pitched over 18 appearances with 17 starts. Gasser transferred to Houston for his remaining collegiate eligibility. In 2021, Gasser went 6-6 with a 2.63 ERA and 105 strikeouts in  innings pitched and was named first team All-American Athletic Conference.
 
Gasser was selected in the second round by the San Diego Padres in the 2021 Major League Baseball draft. He was assigned to the Rookie-level Arizona Complex League Padres to start his professional career, where he made one appearance before being promoted to the Lake Elsinore Storm of Low-A West.

On August 1, 2022, Gasser was traded along with Dinelson Lamet, Taylor Rogers, and Esteury Ruiz to the Milwaukee Brewers for Josh Hader. The Brewers assigned him to the Biloxi Shuckers of the Double-A Southern League.
 

New Mexico Lobos bio
Delta College Mustangs bio
Houston Cougars bio

Joe Gray Jr.

Joseph W. Gray (born March 12, 2000) is an American professional baseball outfielder in the Milwaukee Brewers organization.

Gray attended Hattiesburg High School in Hattiesburg, Mississippi. He was drafted by the Milwaukee Brewers in the second round of the 2018 Major League Baseball draft. He signed with the team, forgoing his commitment to play college baseball at Ole Miss.

Gray made his professional debut with the Arizona League Brewers, batting .182 over 24 games. He played 2019 with the Rocky Mountain Vibes with whom he hit .164 with three home runs over 31 games, and did not play in 2020 because the season was cancelled due to the COVID-19 pandemic. He started 2021 with the Carolina Mudcats before being promoted to the Wisconsin Timber Rattlers. Over 110 games between the two teams, he slashed .252/.355/.499 with twenty home runs, ninety RBIs, and 23 stolen bases.

Brandon Knarr

Brandon Derl Knarr (born June 2, 1998) is an American professional baseball pitcher in the Milwaukee Brewers organization.

Knarr attended Penn Manor High School in Millersville, Pennsylvania as a freshman before transferring to Eastern York High School in Wrightsville, Pennsylvania where he played three years on their baseball team. He went unselected in the 2017 Major League Baseball draft and enrolled at the University of Notre Dame to play college baseball.

Knarr pitched only  innings at Notre Dame as a freshman in 2018, and transferred to the College of Central Florida for his sophomore season in 2019. For Central Florida, he started 13 games and went 6-1 with a 4.66 ERA. After the season's end, he transferred to the University of Tampa with whom he played in six games with a 2.55 ERA before the season was cancelled due to the COVID-19 pandemic. He went unselected in the shortened 2020 Major League Baseball draft and signed with the Milwaukee Brewers as an undrafted free agent.

Knarr made his professional debut in 2021 with the Carolina Mudcats and was promoted to the Wisconsin Timber Rattlers in August. Over 21 games (18 starts) between the two teams, he went 8-3 with a 4.35 ERA and 128 strikeouts over  innings. He opened the 2022 season with Timber Rattlers and was promoted to the Biloxi Shuckers in mid-June. Over 26 starts between the two teams, Knarr went 11-8 with a 2.83 ERA and 152 strikeouts over  innings.

Tristen Lutz

Tristen Drew Lutz (born August 22, 1998) is an American professional baseball outfielder in the Milwaukee Brewers organization.

During his senior season at Martin High School, Lutz batted .430 while slugging 11 home runs and drove in 49 RBIs. Lutz committed to the University of Texas before being selected with the 34th overall pick in the 2017 MLB Draft by the Milwaukee Brewers

On July 5, 2017, Lutz signed with the Brewers and earned a signing bonus of $2.4 million. After signing with Brewers, Lutz was assigned to the Arizona League Brewers. In just 16 games, Lutz hit .279/.347/.559 while hitting three home runs and driving in 11 runs before being promoting to the Helena Brewers. He finished out the rest of the season in the Pioneer League with Helena hitting .333/.432/.559 with six home runs and 16 RBIs in 24 games. He spent 2018 with the Wisconsin Timber Rattlers, slashing .245/.321/.421 with 13 home runs and 63 RBIs in 119 games. He spent 2019 with the Carolina Mudcats, batting .255 with 13 home runs and 54 RBIs over 112 games. In 2021, he played with the Biloxi Shuckers where he hit .217 with seven home runs and 31 RBIs over 64 games.

Blake Perkins

Blake Alexander Perkins (born September 10, 1996) is an American professional baseball outfielder for the Milwaukee Brewers of Major League Baseball (MLB).

The Washington Nationals drafted Perkins in the second round of the 2015 Major League Baseball draft out of Verrado High School in Buckeye, Arizona. He was the 69th overall selection. Although an Arizona State University Sun Devils commit, Perkins chose to sign with the Nationals for an $800,000 bonus.

After signing, Perkins made his professional debut with the GCL Nationals where he hit .211 with one home run and 12 RBIs in 49 games. He spent a majority of 2016 with the Auburn Doubledays, slashing .233/.318/.281 with one home run, 16 RBIs, and ten stolen bases in 59 games. He also played in seven games for the Hagerstown Suns at the end of the season. In 2017, Perkins was Hagerstown's starting center fielder and usual leadoff hitter, sharing an outfield with the likes of top Nationals prospects Juan Soto and Daniel Johnson.

Perkins was ranked by MLB Pipeline as the Nationals' 11th-best prospect entering the 2018 season, in which he started the year with the Potomac Nationals. After batting .234 with one home run, 21 RBIs, and 12 stolen bases through 65 games at the new level, during the Carolina League All-Star Break, Perkins was traded to the Kansas City Royals as part of a prospect package for Royals reliever Kelvin Herrera on June 18, 2018. He was assigned to the Wilmington Blue Rocks. In 64 games for the Blue Rocks, he batted .240 with two home runs, 18 RBIs, and 17 stolen bases. He returned to the Blue Rocks to begin 2019 and was promoted to the Northwest Arkansas Naturals in August. Over 122 games between both teams, he hit .224/.330/.347 with eight home runs, 34 RBIs, and 22 stolen bases. He did not play a minor league game in 2020 since the season was cancelled due to the COVID-19 pandemic.

On December 16, 2021, Perkins signed a minor league contract with the New York Yankees. He elected free agency on November 10, 2022.

Jeferson Quero

Jeferson José Quero (born October 8, 2002) is a Venezuelan professional baseball catcher in the Milwaukee Brewers organization.

Quero signed with the Milwaukee Brewers as an international free agent in July 2019. He made his professional debut in 2021 with the Arizona Complex League Brewers.

Quero started 2022 with the Carolina Mudcats before being promoted to the Wisconsin Timber Rattlers. After the season, he played in the Arizona Fall League.

Cam Robinson

Cameron Robinson (born September 6, 1999) is an American professional baseball pitcher for the Milwaukee Brewers of Major League Baseball (MLB).

Robinson attended University High School in Orlando, Florida. He was drafted by the Milwaukee Brewers in the 23rd round of the 2017 Major League Baseball Draft. He made his professional debut that year with the Arizona League Brewers and also played for them in 2018 and 2019. He also played for the Rocky Mountain Vibes in 2019.

Robinson did not play for a team in 2020 due to the Minor League Baseball season being cancelled because of the Covid-19 pandemic. He returned in 2021 to play for the Carolina Mudcats, Wisconsin Timber Rattlers and one game for the Biloxi Shuckers. He started 2022 with Wisconsin before being promoted to Biloxi.

Robinson was optioned to the Triple-A Nashville Sounds to begin the 2023 season.

Carlos Rodríguez

Carlos Fernando Rodríguez (born November 27, 2001) is a Nicaraguan professional baseball pitcher for the Milwaukee Brewers organization.

Rodríguez attended Miami Christian School and graduated in 2020. He was not selected in the 2020 Major League Baseball draft and enrolled at Florida SouthWestern State College. The Milwaukee Brewers selected him in the sixth round of the 2021 MLB draft. He is playing for the Nicaraguan national baseball team in the 2023 World Baseball Classic (WBC). Rodríguez started their first WBC game.

Adam Seminaris

Adam Joseph Seminaris (born October 19, 1998) is an American professional baseball pitcher in the Milwaukee Brewers organization.

Seminaris attended Ruben S. Ayala High School in Chino Hills, California and played three years of college baseball at Long Beach State University. In 2019, he played collegiate summer baseball with the Orleans Firebirds of the Cape Cod Baseball League. Seminaris posted a 1.23 ERA over four games in 2020 for Long Beach before the season was cancelled due to the COVID-19 pandemic. He was selected by the Los Angeles Angels in the fifth round of the 2020 Major League Baseball draft. Seminaris signed for $140,000, nearly $250,000 under the assigned slot value.

Seminaris made his professional debut in 2021 with the Inland Empire 66ers before he was promoted to the Tri-City Dust Devils. Over twenty games (18 starts) between the two clubs, he went 6-5 with a 4.86 ERA and 112 strikeouts over  innings. He opened the 2022 season back with Tri-City, was promoted to the Rocket City Trash Pandas in early June, and was promoted once again to the Salt Lake Bees in early August. Over 24 games (21 starts) between the three clubs, he went 7-11 with a 3.54 ERA and 97 strikeouts over  innings.

On November 22, 2022, the Angels traded Seminaris, Janson Junk, and Elvis Peguero to the Milwaukee Brewers for Hunter Renfroe.

Long Beach State Dirtbags bio

Abner Uribe

Abner Brismaury Uribe (born June 20, 2000) is a Dominican professional baseball pitcher for the Milwaukee Brewers of Major League Baseball (MLB).

Uribe signed with the Milwaukee Brewers as an international free agent in July 2018. He made his professional debut that season with the Dominican Summer League Brewers. He played 2019 with the Arizona League Brewers and the Rocky Mountain Vibes.

Uribe did not play for a minor league team in 2020 due to the cancellation of the season because of the Covid-19 pandemic. He returned in 2021 to pitch for the Carolina Mudcats and after the season played in the Arizona Fall League. Uribe pitched in only two games in 2022 for the Biloxi Shuckers due to a torn meniscus in his right knee. He played in the Arizona Fall League for the second consecutive year after the season.

Uribe was optioned to Double-A Biloxi to begin the 2023 season.

Gus Varland

 Augustus James Varland (born November 6, 1996) is an American professional baseball pitcher for the Milwaukee Brewers of Major League Baseball (MLB).

Varland was drafted by the Oakland Athletics in the 14th round of the 2018 MLB draft out of Concordia University. He was later traded to the Los Angeles Dodgers on February 12, 2021 (along with Sheldon Neuse) in exchange for Adam Kolarek and Cody Thomas.

On December 7, 2022, Varland was selected by the Milwaukee Brewers in the Rule 5 Draft.

Zach Vennaro

Zachary Vennaro (born June 3, 1996) is an American professional baseball pitcher in the Milwaukee Brewers organization.

Vennaro attended New York Mills High School, Monroe Community College, and the University of Mount Olive. During his final year at Mount Olive in 2018, he posted an ERA of 0.81 over  innings, but still went unselected in the 2018 Major League Baseball draft. He spent the summer playing in the Coastal Plain League. He opened the 2019 season playing in the Can-Am League, but left the league after he was signed by the Milwaukee Brewers as a free agent in mid-June.

Vennaro made his professional debut with the Arizona League Brewers with whom he had a 3.86 ERA over 28 innings. He spent the 2021 season playing with the Biloxi Shuckers where he made 37 relief appearances and went 1-3 with a 7.61 ERA, fifty strikeouts, and 23 walks over  innings. Vennaro opened the 2022 season with Biloxi and was promoted to the Nashville Sounds in late May.

Joey Wiemer

Joseph Daryl Wiemer (born February 11, 1999) is an American professional baseball outfielder in the Milwaukee Brewers organization.

Wiemer attended Bedford Senior High School in Temperance, Michigan and played college baseball at the University of Cincinnati. In 2019, he played collegiate summer baseball with the Harwich Mariners of the Cape Cod Baseball League and was named a league all-star. He was drafted by the Milwaukee Brewers in the fourth round of the 2020 Major League Baseball draft.

Wiemer made his professional debut in 2021 with the Carolina Mudcats before being promoted to the Wisconsin Timber Rattlers. Over 109 games between the two teams, he slashed .295/.403/.556 with 27 home runs, 77 RBIs, and thirty stolen bases.

Justin Yeager

Justin Richard Yeager (born January 20, 1998) is an American professional baseball pitcher for the Milwaukee Brewers organization.

Yeager attended Southern Illinois University, where he played college baseball for the Southern Illinois Salukis. The Atlanta Braves selected Yeager in the 33rd round of the 2019 MLB draft.

On December 12, 2022, the Braves sent to the Milwaukee Brewers in a three-team trade in which the Braves acquired Sean Murphy, the Brewers also acquired William Contreras, and Joel Payamps, and the Athletics acquired Manny Piña, Esteury Ruiz, Kyle Muller, Freddy Tarnok, and Royber Salinas.

Freddy Zamora

Freddy Francisco Zamora (born November 1, 1998) is a Nicaraguan professional baseball shortstop in the Milwaukee Brewers organization.

Zamora attended Miami Killian Senior High School in Kendall, Florida and played college baseball at the University of Miami. He was drafted by the Milwaukee Brewers in the second round of the 2020 Major League Baseball draft.

Zamora made his professional debut in 2021 with the Carolina Mudcats before being promoted to the Wisconsin Timber Rattlers.

Full Triple-A to Rookie League rosters

Triple-A

Double-A

High-A

Single-A

Rookie

Foreign Rookie

References 

Lists of minor league baseball players
Milwaukee Brewers lists